Giuseppe Muraglia (born August 3, 1979 in Andria) is an Italian racing cyclist, who last rode for the Italian team D'Angelo & Antenucci-Nippo. In October 2007 he was suspended from riding for two years following a positive test after winning the Clásica de Almería.

Professional career
In 2007 he tested positive for hCG after winning the 2007 edition of Clásica de Almería. In late 2007 he was suspended from racing for two years and he was also sacked from his team, .

Palmarès 

2002
1st, Baby Giro
2005
1st, Stage 2, Giro del Trentino
2007
1st, Clásica de Almería
2010
1st, Stage 3, Giro della Provincia di Reggio Calabria

See also
 List of doping cases in cycling
List of sportspeople sanctioned for doping offences

References

External links

1979 births
Living people
People from Andria
Italian male cyclists
Doping cases in cycling
Italian sportspeople in doping cases
Cyclists from Apulia
Sportspeople from the Province of Barletta-Andria-Trani